Pedro Tomás Reñones Crego (born 9 August 1960), known as Tomás as a player, is a Spanish former footballer who played as a right back.

He was best known for his spell at Atlético Madrid, for which he played 12 professional seasons, also being a regular for Spain in the late 80s, representing the nation in one World Cup and one European Championship.

Club career
Tomás was born in Santiago de Compostela, Galicia. After one season with hometown's SD Compostela he joined Atlético Madrid in 1981, first playing with the reserves. He made his La Liga debut in 1984–85 and never again lost his starting XI berth, going on to make 483 competitive appearances for the club.

On 25 May 1996, aged 35, Tomás took the field in the 83rd minute of his final game, a home fixture against Albacete Balompié. Although he appeared in only 12 matches during the campaign, he aided the Colchoneros to an historic double, and retired altogether in 1998 after two stints in the lower leagues.

International career
Tomás earned 19 caps for the Spanish national team, and was selected for the 1986 FIFA World Cup and UEFA Euro 1988 (playing a total of eight matches and completing seven). His debut came on 20 November 1985, in a 0–0 friendly with Austria in Zaragoza.

Post-retirement
Reñones embraced a career in politics after retiring, being elected by the Liberal Independent Group – GIL, founded by longtime Atlético president Jesús Gil – to the Marbella city council.

After the local mayor was arrested due to a corruption scandal, he took office in 2006 as interim, but soon faced the same charges and was arrested by the Spanish police, as part of Operation Malaya.

Honours
Atlético Madrid
La Liga: 1995–96
Copa del Rey: 1984–85, 1990–91, 1991–92, 1995–96
Supercopa de España: 1985
UEFA Cup Winners' Cup runner-up: 1985–86

References

External links

1960 births
Living people
Spanish footballers
Footballers from Santiago de Compostela
Association football defenders
La Liga players
Segunda División players
Segunda División B players
SD Compostela footballers
Atlético Madrid B players
Atlético Madrid footballers
CA Marbella footballers
Spain international footballers
1986 FIFA World Cup players
UEFA Euro 1988 players
Spanish politicians
Liberal Independent Group politicians
Municipal councillors in the province of Málaga